Lyz Lenz is an American author and editor. She was previously a columnist at The Cedar Rapids Gazette and served as managing editor of The Rumpus. She is the author of God Land and Belabored.

Life and career 
Lenz moved from Vermillion, South Dakota to Minneapolis, Minnesota while in high school and graduated from Eden Prairie High School. She has an undergraduate degree from Gustavus Adolphus College. Lenz belonged to Evangelical churches but came into conflict with their orthodoxies including on the role of women in the church and the exclusion of gay and lesbian people.

Lenz's writing has been published by publications including the Columbia Journalism Review, The Washington Post, and The Gazette. A divorced mother, she wrote in Glamour about her self-imposed 2-year hiatus from cooking.

In September 2019, Lenz was a moderator for an LGBTQ discussion with U.S. presidential candidates Joe Biden, Kamala Harris, and Elizabeth Warren in Cedar Rapids, Iowa.

Lenz's first book, titled God Land explores her personal experiences and the role of religion and politics in rural America during the Trump era. Her second book, Belabored, focuses on the rights and autonomy that pregnant women ought to be afforded, the ways in which religion and politics impacts how pregnant women are treated in the U.S., and her own experience being pregnant.

Bibliography
Belabored: A Vindication of the Rights of Pregnant Women, August 11, 2020, Bold Type Books
 God Land: A Story of Faith, Loss, and Renewal in Middle America, August 1, 2019, Indiana University Press
"All the Angry Women", essay in the anthology Not that Bad: Dispatches from Rape Culture edited by Roxane Gay
"Cottonwood Creek", essay in the anthology Empty the Pews: Stories of Leaving the Church edited by Chrissy Stroop and Lauren O'Neal

References

External links
Official website
List and links to Lenz's writings at Contently
C-Span appearance for her book Godland

Living people
American women columnists
American online publication editors
Gustavus Adolphus College alumni
Journalists from South Dakota
21st-century American journalists
21st-century American non-fiction writers
21st-century American women writers
American women non-fiction writers
1982 births